Carlos Slim Helú (born 28 January 1940) is a Mexican business magnate, investor, and philanthropist. From 2010 to 2013, Slim was ranked as the richest person in the world by the Forbes business magazine. He derived his fortune from his extensive holdings in a considerable number of Mexican companies through his conglomerate, Grupo Carso. As of February 2023, Bloomberg Billionaires Index ranked him as the 10th-richest person in the world with a net worth of $86 billion, making him the richest person in Latin America.

Slim's corporate conglomerate spans numerous industries across the Mexican economy, of which includes education, health care, industrial manufacturing, transportation, real estate, mass media, energy, hospitality, entertainment, high-technology, retail, sports and financial services. He accounts for 40% of the listings on the Mexican Stock Exchange, while his net worth is equivalent to about 6% of Mexico's gross domestic product. As of 2016, he is the largest single shareholder of The New York Times Company.

Early life 
Slim was born on 28 January 1940, in Mexico City, to Julián Slim Haddad (born Khalil Salim Haddad Aglamaz) and Linda Helú Atta, both Maronite Christians from Lebanon. He decided at a young age that he wanted to be a businessman,
and received business lessons from his father, who taught him finance, management and accounting, teaching him how to analyze, interpret, and read financial statements as well as the importance of keeping accurate financial records.

At the age of 11, Slim invested in a government savings bond, which taught him about the concept of compound interest. He eventually saved every financial and business transaction he made into a personal ledger book, which he still keeps. At the age of 12, he made his first stock purchase, by buying shares of a Mexican bank. By the age of 15, Slim had become a shareholder in Mexico's largest bank. At the age of 17, he earned 200 pesos a week working for his father's company. He went on to study civil engineering at the National Autonomous University of Mexico, where he also concurrently taught algebra and linear programming.

Though Slim was a civil engineering major, he displayed an interest in economics. He took economics courses in Chile when he completed his engineering degree. Graduating as a civil engineering major, Slim has stated that his mathematical ability and his background of linear programming was a key factor in helping him gain an edge in the business world, especially when analyzing the financial statements of prospective companies when making business decisions and potential investment acquisitions.

Business career

1960s 
After graduating from university in 1961, Slim began his business career by starting off as a stock trader in Mexico, often working 14-hour days. In 1965, profits from Slim's private businessses and investments reached , enabling him to start the stock brokerage house Inversora Bursátil. He also began laying the financial groundwork for his eventual conglomerate, Grupo Carso. In 1965, he also acquired Jarritos del Sur, a Mexican bottling and soft drink company. In 1966, worth , he established Inmuebles Carso, a real estate agency and holding company.

1970s 
Companies in the Mexican construction, soft drink, printing, real estate, bottling and mining industries were the initial focus of Slim's burgeoning business career. He later expanded his business operations and commercial activities by venturing into numerous industries across the Mexican economy including auto parts, aluminum, airlines, chemicals, tobacco, cable and wire manufacturing, paper and packaging, copper and mineral extraction, tires, cement, retail, hotels, beverage distributors, telecommunications and financial services (Slim's Grupo Financiero Inbursa sells insurance and manages mutual funds and pension plans for millions of ordinary Mexicans). By 1972, he had established or acquired a further seven businesses in these categories, including a construction equipment rental company. In 1980, he consolidated his business interests by forming Grupo Galas as the parent company of a conglomerate that had interests in industrial manufacturing, construction,  mining, retail, food, and tobacco.

1980s 
In 1982, the Mexican economy contracted rapidly. As many banks were struggling and foreign investors were cutting back on investing and scurrying, Slim began  investing heavily and acquired many Mexican flagship businesses at depressed valuations. Much of Slim's business dealings involved a simple strategy, which entails buying a business and retaining it for its cash flow, or eventually selling the stake at a greater profit in future, thereby netting the capital gains as well as reinvesting the initial principal into a new business. In addition, Grupo Carso's corporate conglomerate structure allows Slim to purchase numerous stakes across a wide range of industries, thereby making the overall conglomerate nearly recession-proof in the event that one or more industry sectors of the Mexican economy do not fare well.

Amidst the Mexican economic downturn before its recovery in 1985, Slim invested heavily by snapping up numerous Mexican flagship companies for pennies on the dollar. He purchased all or a sizeable percentage of numerous Mexican businesses at significant discounts, including Empresas Frisco, a mining concessionary and chemical maker, Industrias Nacobre, a copper manufacturer, Reynolds Aluminio, a Mexican aluminum concern, Compañía Hulera Euzkadi (Mexico's largest tire maker), and Bimex hotels, a hotel chain. He also became the majority shareholder of Sanborn Hermanos, a prominent Mexican food retailer, gift shop and restaurant chain. Slim spent  to acquire the Mexican insurance agency Seguros de México in 1984, and later subsumed the company into the firm, Seguros Inbursa. The value of his stake in Seguros eventually became worth  by 2007, after four spinoffs. He also acquired a 40% and 50% interest in the Mexican arms of British American Tobacco and The Hershey Company, respectively. He acquired large blocks of Denny's and Firestone Tires. From Seguros de México, Fianzas La Guardiana and Casa de Bolsa Inbursa, he formed the Grupo Financiero Inbursa, a financial services provider. Many of these corporate acquisitions were financed by the revenues and cash flows from Cigatam, a tobacco distributor which he purchased early in during the early 1980s Mexican economic downturn.

In 1988, Slim bought Nacobre, a copper manufacturing company that manufactures, markets and distributes copper and copper alloy products, along with a chemical company, Química Fluor.

1990s 
Slim earned windfall profits in the early 1990s when Mexican government began privatizing its telecom industry. With his conglomerate Grupo Carso, he acquired Telmex, a landline telephone operator from the Mexican government. In 1990, Grupo Carso was floated as a public company initially in Mexico and then worldwide. Grupo Carso also acquired majority ownership of Porcelanite, a tile making company in 1990.

Later in 1990, Slim acted in concert with France Télécom and Southwestern Bell Corporation to purchase the landline telecommunications operator Telmex from the Mexican government, when Mexico began privatizing its national industries. Slim was an early investment backer in Telmex, as the cash flows and revenues of the company eventually formed the bulk of his private fortune. By 2006, Telmex controlled and operated 90 percent of the telephone lines in Mexico, and his wireless telecommunications company, Telcel, which was created out of the Radiomóvil Dipsa company, operated almost 80 percent of all the country's cellphones.

In 1991, he acquired Hoteles Calinda (now OSTAR Grupo Hotelero), a hotel chain and in 1993, he increased his stakes in General Tire, an American tiremaker and a distributor of aluminum profiles and aluminum concern Grupo Aluminio to the point where he had a majority interest in the company.

In 1996, Slim's conglomerate company Grupo Carso was split into three separate companies: Carso Global Telecom, Grupo Carso, and Invercorporación. In the following year, Slim bought the Mexican arm of Sears Roebuck.

In 1999, Slim began expanding his business interests beyond Latin America. Though the bulk of his holdings remained in Mexico, he began targeting the United States for foreign investments.

2000s 
Slim made headlines within the American business scene in 2003 when he began purchasing large stakes in a number of major US retailers such as Barnes & Noble, OfficeMax, Office Depot, Circuit City, Borders, and CompUSA. Much of the rationale behind Slim's international commercial expansion beyond Mexico was due to a running joke in Mexican business circles where "there was nothing left to acquire in Mexico." He set up Telmex USA branch and also acquired a stake in Tracfone, an American cellular telephone operator. Concurrently, Slim established Carso Infraestructura y Construcción, S. A. (CICSA) as a non-profit construction and engineering firm within Grupo Carso. During the same year, Slim underwent heart surgery and subsequently passed on much of his day-to-day corporate involvement to his children and their spouses. 

América Telecom, the holding company for América Móvil, was incorporated in 2000. Concurrently, Telmex also spun off its international cellular phone division for a $15 billion listing of America Movil SA on the New York Stock Exchange. Telmex has taken numerous stakes of various international cellular telephone operators outside of Mexico, including the Brazilian ATL and Telecom Americas concerns, Techtel in Argentina, and others in Guatemala and Ecuador. In subsequent years, the company made further investments across Latin America, with companies in Colombia, Nicaragua, Peru, Chile, Honduras, and El Salvador, well as a joint venture with the American software house, Microsoft called Tlmsn, a Spanish-language web portal.

In 2005 Slim invested in Volaris, a Mexican airline and established Impulsora del Desarrollo y el Empleo en América Latina SAB de CV (using the acronym "IDEAL"—roughly translated as "Promoter of Development and Employment in Latin America"), a Mexican construction and civil engineering company primarily engaged in not-for-profit infrastructure development. Since 2006,  IDEAL won three infrastructure contracts yet it faces stiff competition from a number of other Mexican and Spanish construction companies.

In 2007, after having amassed a 50.1% stake in the Cigatam tobacco manufacturer, Slim sold a large portion of his equity to Philip Morris for US$1.1billion. During the same year, Slim sold off his entire stake of Porcelanite for US$800 million, a Mexican tile-maker that he acquired back in 1990. He also licensed the Saks name and opened the Mexican arm of Saks Fifth Avenue retailer in Santa Fe, Mexico. Also in 2007, the estimated value of all of Slim's companies totaled US$150billion. On December 8, 2007, Grupo Carso announced that the remaining 103 CompUSA retail stores would be either liquidated or sold, bringing an end to the struggling company, although the information technology division of CompUSA continued under the name Telvista with various U.S. locations in Dallas, Texas (U.S. Corporate Office) and Danville, Virginia. Telvista has five centers in Mexico (three in Tijuana, one center in Mexicali, and one in México City). After 28 years of corporate involvement, Slim became the Honorary Lifetime Chairman of the business.

In 2008, Slim took a 6.4% stake valued at $27 million in the New York Times Company, a prominent American newspaper publisher. Slim increased his stake to 8% by 2012. Slim's stake in the Times increased again to 16.8% of the company's Class A shares on 20 January 2015 when he exercised stock options to purchase 15.9 million shares, making him the largest shareholder in the company. The New York Times Company's Class A shares are available for purchase by the public and offer less control over the company than Class B shares, which are privately held. According to the company's 2016 annual filings, Slim owned 17.4% of the company's Class A shares, and none of the company's Class B shares.

2010s 

In 2012, Slim sold the broadcast rights for the Leon games to the American terrestrial television network, Telemundo, and the cable channel Fox Sports in Mexico and the rest of Latin America and to the website mediotiempo.com. The games are also broadcast on the Internet through UNO TV, offered by Telmex. Slim has been involved with broadcasting sports outside Mexico to larger markets such as the United States. In March 2012, América Móvil acquired the broadcast rights for the Olympic Games in Sochi 2014 and the Brazil 2016 for Latin America.

In March 2012, Slim, along with American television host Larry King, established Ora TV, an on-demand digital television network that produces and distributes television shows including Larry King Now, Politicking with Larry King, Recessionista, and Jesse Ventura Uncensored.

In September 2012, Slim bought 30% stakes in Pachuca and León, two Mexican soccer teams through his telecommunications company America Movil. In December 2012, he bought all the shares of the second division team Estudiantes Tecos. Slim has also completed business deals for the television rights to games of the Leon soccer team. His company America Movil purchased 30 percent of the team along with transmission rights as Slim doesn't have the rights to transmit content by broadcast television or cable TV as well as putting him in competition with Televisa and TV Azteca, two television companies with rights to the rest of Mexican soccer's first division.

In July 2013, Slim's company America Movil invested US$40million in Shazam, a British commercial mobile phone-based music identification service for an undisclosed share of ownership. America Movil partnered with the company to aid its growth into advertising and television and help the audio recognition service expand in Latin America.

In November 2013, Slim invested US$60 million in the Israeli startup Mobli, a company that deals with connections between people and communities corralled according to different interests.

In December 2013, Slim's private equity fund, Sinca Inbursa, sold its stake in the Mexican pharmaceutical company Landsteiner Scientific. Slim had acquired a 27.51% stake in the company in June 2008, which represented 6.6% of Sinca's investment portfolio. The private equity fund's investments are mainly concentrated in the transportation and infrastructure sectors and the fund garnered a total market cap of 5.152 billion pesos at the end of 2012.

On 23 April 2014, Slim took control of Telekom Austria, Austria's largest telecommunications company, which operates telcos in countries such as Bulgaria, Croatia and Belarus, under a 10-year agreement. It was Slim's first successful business acquisition in Europe. In a syndicate holding structure the Austrian state holding company OIAG's 28% are combined with Slim's 27% ownership. Labor representatives boycotted attending the OIAG supervisory board meeting for 12 hours criticizing lack of explicit job guarantees.

In January 2015, Grupo Carso publicly launched Claro Musica, an online music service that is a Latin American equivalent of iTunes and Spotify. Slim, along with his son, increased their corporate presence in Mexico's music industry, particularly in the retail music sector since 2013.

In March 2015, Slim made his presence known in the Spanish business scene by buying stakes in various troubled Spanish companies while perusing potential acquisitions across Europe. Slim's investment company, Inmobiliaria Carso, announced it will buy a stake in the Spanish bank, Bankia, which couples with Slim's other purchase of Realia, a Spanish real estate company, where Slim is the second largest shareholder holding a 25% equity stake, behind Fomento de Construcciones y Contratas, a Spanish construction company where Slim is also an active minor shareholder.

On April 15, 2015, Slim formed oil company Carso Oil & Gas. A report that was released by the new company listed its assets at 3.5billion pesos (approximately ), placed within 17.7million shares. Upon formation of the company, Slim remained sanguine about the company's future potential and Mexico's burgeoning energy sector where the state monopoly ceased to exist.

On July 25, 2015, Slim's investment group Control Empresarial de Capitales invested in IMatchative, a technology startup that ranks the world's hedge funds creating in-depth behavioral profiles and business analytics.

Family and personal life
Slim's father, Khalil Salim Haddad Aglamaz, was born on 17 July 1888 in Jezzine, Lebanon (then part of the Ottoman Empire). In 1902, at the age of 14, Haddad emigrated to Mexico alone, and later changed his name to Julián Slim Haddad. It was not uncommon for Lebanese children to be sent abroad before they reached the age of 15 to avoid being conscripted into the Ottoman Army, and four of Haddad's older brothers were already living in Mexico at the time of his arrival.

In 1911, Julián established a dry goods retail store, La Estrella de Oriente (The Star of the Orient). By 1921, he had begun investing in real estate in the flourishing commercial district of Mexico City where Julián acquired prime Mexican real estate at fire sale prices and in the Zocalo District during the 1910–17 Mexican Revolution. By 1922, Julián's net worth reached $1,012,258 pesos, diversified among various assets including real estate, privately-controlled businesses and stocks.

In August 1926, Julián Slim married Linda Helú Atta. Linda, of Lebanese ancestry, was born in Parral, Chihuahua. Her parents had immigrated to Mexico from Lebanon in the late 19th century. Upon immigrating to Mexico, her parents founded one of the first Arabic-language magazines for the Lebanese-Mexican community, using a printing press they had brought with them. Julian and Linda had six children: Nour, Alma, Julián, José, Carlos, and Linda. Julián senior died in 1953, when Carlos was 13 years old.

Julian's major successful business ventures and investment undertakings became the source of considerable wealth for himself and his family. As a prominent businessman and wealthy investor who remained a reputable pillar within the Lebanese Mexican community, Julian was known for his shrewd business acumen and his astute knack when making investments during bad economic cycles (which occurred frequently in Mexico). Julián was known for his business savvy, strong work ethic, and commitment to traditional Lebanese moral values.

In February 2011, Julian, the oldest brother of Carlos, died aged 74. He was an active businessman and worked in one of Mexico's top intelligence agencies.

Personal life 
Carlos Slim was married to Soumaya Domit from 1967 until her death in 1999. Among her interests were various philanthropic projects. Slim has six children: Carlos, Marco Antonio, Patrick, Soumaya, Vanessa, and Johanna. His three older sons serve in key positions in the companies controlled by Slim where most are involved in the day-to-day running of Slim's business empire. Slim underwent heart surgery in 1999. In high school, Slim's favorite subjects were history, cosmography, and mathematics. Slim and his wife had a very happy marriage, and he indicated that he does not intend to remarry.

In his office, Slim does not have a computer, and instead keeps all his financial data in hand-written notebooks. Due to the vast size of his business empire, he often jokes that he cannot keep track of all the companies he manages. Slim is a Maronite Catholic, and he is one of the prominent backers of Legion of Christ, a Roman Catholic religious institute.

On 25 January 2021, it was reported that Slim had contracted COVID-19.

Personal fortune

Wealth 
On 29 March 2007, Slim surpassed American investor Warren Buffett as the world's second richest person with an estimated net worth of  compared with Buffett's .

On 4 August 2007, The Wall Street Journal ran a cover story profiling Slim. The article said, "While the market value of his stake in publicly traded companies could decline at any time, at the moment he is probably wealthier than Bill Gates". According to The Wall Street Journal, Slim credits part of his ability to "discover investment opportunities" early to the writings of his friend, futurist author Alvin Toffler.

On 8 August 2007, Fortune magazine reported that Slim had overtaken Gates as the world's richest person. Gates' net worth was estimated to be at least .

On 5 March 2008, Forbes ranked Slim as the world's second-richest person, behind Warren Buffett and ahead of Bill Gates.
On 11 March 2009, Forbes ranked Slim as the world's third-richest person, behind Gates and Buffett and ahead of Larry Ellison.

He was the first Mexican to top the list. It was the first time in 16 years that the person on top of the list was not from the United States. It was also the first time the person at the top of the list was from an emerging economy. Between 2008 and 2010, Slim more than doubled his net worth from $35 to $75 billion.

On 16 May 2013, Bloomberg L.P. ranked Slim the second-richest person in the world, after Bill Gates.

In December 2016, Slim's net worth was estimated to be US$48.1 billion.

In 2017, his net worth was reported to be $54.5 billion.

In 2019, his net worth was said to be at least $58.1 billion, making him the richest man in Mexico.

In October 2020, his net worth was estimated at $53.7 billion.

In 2021 Forbes stated his net worth as $73.3 billion.

Real estate 
Slim is an active real estate investor. His real estate holding company, Inmobiliaria Carso has developed, invested, owned and operated many residential and commercial real estate properties across Mexico since the 1960s. His real estate company constructured Plaza Carso in Mexico City, where most of his business ventures share a common headquarters address. Since the early 2000s to the mid-2010s, Slim has been making private real estate investments internationally beyond Mexico, particularly in Spain and the United States. 

In May 2014, Slim opened Inbursa Aquarium, Latin America's largest aquarium. Slim owns the Duke Seamans mansion, a 1901 beaux arts house on 5th Avenue in New York City, which he bought for $44 million in 2010. The mansion is 20,000 square feet and has 12 bedrooms, 14 bathrooms, and a doctor's office in the basement. In May 2015, he listed the property for sale at $80 million, nearly twice what he had paid.

In March 2015, Slim began examining Spain as a potential investment destination, by purchasing cheap properties in Spain's real estate sector at rock-bottom prices in its ailing economy.

Reactions 
Slim's growing wealth has been a subject of controversy, because it has been amassed in a developing country where average per capita income does not surpass  a year, and nearly 17% of the population lives in poverty. Critics claim that Slim is a monopolist, pointing to Telmex's control of 90% of the Mexican landline telephone market. Slim's wealth is the equivalent of roughly 5% of Mexico's annual economic output. Telmex, of which 49.1% is owned by Slim and his family, charges among the highest usage fees in the world, according to the Organisation for Economic Co-operation and Development.

According to Celso Garrido, economist at the Universidad Nacional Autónoma de México, Slim's domination of Mexico's conglomerates prevents the growth of smaller companies, resulting in a shortage of paying jobs, forcing many Mexicans to seek better lives in the U.S.

Slim was criticized by the Dutch minister of economic affairs, Henk Kamp, in 2013 for attempting to expand his telecommunications empire beyond the Americas by América Móvil's buy-out offer to KPN, a Dutch landline and mobile telecommunications operator. Kamp reiterated his criticisms of Slim stating: "an acquisition of KPN by a 'foreign company' could have consequences for the Netherlands' national security". Two years after Slim's failed bid to take over the company, mainly due to political intervention and Slim's paucity of interest in purchasing the company, Slim's America Movil SAB began offering 2.25billion euros. America Movil now controls a 21.1 percent stake of KPN with a market value of 3.1billion euros as of 20 May 2015. Slim has been slowly decreasing his holdings since he was forced to withdraw a 7.2-billion-euro bid for the Dutch phone line carrier in 2013 after negotiations collapsed.

In response to the criticism, Slim has stated, "When you live for others' opinions, you are dead. I don't want to live thinking about how I'll be remembered [by Mexican people]," claiming indifference about his position on Forbes list of the world's richest people. He has said he has no interest in becoming the world's richest person. When asked to explain his sudden increase in wealth at a press conference soon after Forbes annual rankings were published, he said, "The stock market goes up ... and down", and noted that his fortune could quickly drop.

In 2016, then Presidential candidate and eventual 45th President of the United States Donald Trump accused Slim of being involved in editorial articles critical of him published in The New York Times during his 2016 Presidential campaign. The Times responded to these accusations by saying that Slim had never interfered in editorial policy.

Later in 2017, Trump and Slim met in person. Slim spoke quite positively about the meeting.

Philanthropy 
Slim has been publicly skeptical of The Giving Pledge by Bill Gates and Warren Buffett giving away at least half of their fortunes. But—according to his spokesman—he devoted , or roughly 5%, to his Carlos Slim foundation as of 2011. Though Slim has not gone as far as Gates and Buffett in pledging more than half of his fortune, Slim has expressed firm support for philanthropy and has advised budding entrepreneurs that businessmen must do more than givethey "should participate in solving problems".

In 2019, Forbes put Slim in the list of the world's most generous philanthropists outside of the US.

Fundación Carlos Slim 
Established in 1986,  sponsors the Museo Soumaya in Mexico City, named after Slim's late wife, Soumaya Domit, opened 2011. It holds 66,000 pieces, including religious relics, contains the world's second-largest collection of Rodin sculptures, including The Kiss, the largest Salvador Dalí collection in Latin America, works by Leonardo da Vinci, Pablo Picasso, Pierre-Auguste Renoir, and coins from the viceroys of Spain. The inauguration in 2011 was attended by the President of Mexico, Nobel Prize laureates, writers and other celebrities.

After stating that he had donated  of dividends to Fundación Carlos Slim,  in 2006, and another  in 2010, Slim was ranked fifth in Forbes' World's Biggest Givers in May 2011. Education and health care projects have included $100 million to perform 50,000 cataract surgeries in Peru.

Fundación Telmex 
Furthermore, it was to work in support of an initiative of Bill Clinton to aid the people of Latin America. The foundation has organized Copa Telmex, an amateur sports tournament, recognized in 2007 and 2008 by Guinness World Records as having the most participants of any such tournament in the world. Telmex sponsored the Sauber F1 team for the 2011 season.
 Telmex donated at least $1 million to the Clinton Foundation.

Fundación del Centro Histórico de la Ciudad de México A.C. 
Slim has been Chair of the Council for the Restoration of the Historic Downtown of Mexico City since 2001.

In 2011, he, along with the president of Mexico, Mexico City mayor, and Mexico City archbishop, inaugurated the first phase of Plaza Mariana close to Basilica de Guadalupe. The complex, whose construction was funded by Slim, includes an evangelization center, museum, columbarium, health center, and market.

Awards 

 Entrepreneurial Merit Medal of Honor in 1985 from Mexico's Chamber of Commerce.
 Commander in the Belgian Order of Leopold II
 Golden Plate Award of the American Academy of Achievement in 1994
 CEO of the year in 2003 by Latin Trade magazine
 CEO of the decade in 2004 by Latin Trade magazine
 Fundacion Telmex received in 2007 the National Sports Prize of Mexico for sports promotion
 In 2008, his philanthropy was recognized with the award of The National Order of the Cedar by the Lebanese government.
 In 2011, the Hispanic Society of America awarded Fundacion Carlos Slim the Sorolla Medal for its contribution to the arts and culture
 On 20 May 2012, Slim was awarded an honorary doctorate in public service from George Washington University.
 On 21 March 2020, he was awarded the Queen Sofía Spanish Institute Sophia Award for Excellence at an awards luncheon.

References

External links 

 
 Carlos Slim at Bloomberg L.P.

 
1940 births
Businesspeople from Mexico City
Businesspeople in metals
Living people
Mexican billionaires
Mexican businesspeople in retailing
Mexican businesspeople in the oil industry
Mexican chief executives
Mexican company founders
Mexican Eastern Catholics
Mexican expatriates in the United States
Mexican football chairmen and investors
Mexican investors
Mexican Maronites
Mexican mass media owners
Mexican mining businesspeople
Mexican people of Lebanese descent
Mexican philanthropists
Mexican real estate businesspeople
Mexican stock traders
Mexican telecommunications industry businesspeople
Mexican venture capitalists
National Autonomous University of Mexico alumni
People named in the Paradise Papers
Recipients of the National Order of the Cedar
Samsung people
Carlos
The New York Times people